Sabado Chiquito, or Sabado Chiquito de Corporan (Sábado Chiquito de Corporán in Spanish) is a children's variety show in the Dominican Republic between 1988 and 2011, for children from the ages of 6 to 12. It was a division of Sabado de Corporan, a show dedicated to adults which included an entire morning segment on the Color Visión network. The shows were produced and headed by the same company; both studios were located in Santo Domingo.

Overview
The show was aired in front of a live studio audience which participated in competitions and sketches throughout the show. Originally a segment of Sabado de Corporan in 1990, it became a weekly morning show in 1991.

It included informative segments, dancing, singing, sketches, and contests. The show has been often ridiculed because of its campy and childish style.

The show, targeted to child audiences, might also appealed to preteen audiences and some teenagers. It changes hosts and cast members as they mature or decide to leave. Paloma Rodriguez was an example of this, having left the show after deciding to focus more on school than on acting.

Memorable cast members include hostess Isabel Aracena (known as Isha), Linda García, Mabel Martínez, Zeny Leyva Scarlet Mejia, and correspondent Paloma Rodriguez, a Santo Domingo socialite who currently attends 11th Grade in Santo Domingo, Dominican Republic.

Numerous hosts and communications professionals were mentored on this show, such as Chiquii Hadad, Edilenia Tactuck, Angel Puello, Sheyla Cotes, Giordano Landrón, and Wendy Th.

Due to financial issues during its latest season, Sabado Chiquito was cancelled in June 2011.

Producers
 Angel Puello 
 Edilenia Tactuk
 Carlen Espinal
 Dio Lluberes
 Elizabeth Crespo
 Carlos Reyes
 Geisha Rivas
 Emma Caro
 Katty Cocco
 Sheila Cotes
 Giordano Landron 
 Eugenio Ricardo

References 

Dominican Republic television series
1988 Dominican Republic television series debuts
2011 Dominican Republic television series endings
1980s Dominican Republic television series
1990s Dominican Republic television series
2000s Dominican Republic television series
2010s Dominican Republic television series
Color Visión original programming